The Bonnie Bronson Fellowship, named after American painter and sculptor Bonnie Bronson, is an award presented annually to Pacific Northwest artists.

Recipients

 Christine Bourdette (1992)
 Judy Cooke (1993)
 Ronna Neuenschwander (1994)
 Fernanda D'Agostino (1995)
 Carolyn King (1996)
 Lucinda Parker (1997)
 Judy Hill (1998)
 Adriene Cruz (1999)
 Helen Lessick (2000)
 Ann Hughes (2001)
 Malia Jensen (2002)
 Christopher Rauschenberg (2003)
 Kristy Edmunds (2004)
 Paul Sutinen (2005)
 Bill Will (2006)
 Laura Ross-Paul (2007)
 MK Guth (2008)
 Marie Watt (2009)
 David Eckard (2010)
 Nan Curtis (2011)
 Pat Boas (2012)
 Wynne Greenwood (2013)
 Vanessa Renwick (2014)
 Cynthia Lahti (2015)
 Lynne Woods Turner (2016)
 Susie Lee (2017)
 Kristan Kennedy (2018)
 Tannaz Farsi (2019)
 Natalie Ball (2020)
 Ed Bereal (2021)
 Dawn Cerny (2022)
 Samantha Wall (2022)

References

External links
 Bonnie Bronson's Legacy Lives On, Oregon Public Broadcasting

Culture of the Pacific Northwest
Visual arts awards